Michael Leon Carr (born January 9, 1951) is an American former professional basketball player in the National Basketball Association (NBA) and American Basketball Association (ABA), and former head coach and General Manager of the Boston Celtics.

Playing career
In Teachey, North Carolina, Carr was the first African-American member of Wallace-Rose Hill High School’s basketball team. Afterwards, he played four years at  Guilford College, and was then selected by the Kansas City Kings of the American Basketball Association with the seventh pick of the fifth round of the 1973 NBA draft, though he never played for the team.  He subsequently signed with the Kentucky Colonels but was one of the final roster cuts the Colonels made in camp, and was released.  The following season, Carr played in Israel for the American-owned Israel Sabras in the short-lived European Professional Basketball League. For leading his team to the championship, leading the league in scoring, and emerging second in rebounding, he was named Most Valuable Player.

During the 1975–76 ABA season, Carr played for the Spirits of St. Louis, averaging 12.2 points and 6.2 rebounds per game, and was named to the ABA's All-Rookie Team.  The Spirits of St. Louis were one of two ABA teams (the Colonels being the other) that did not join the NBA in the ABA–NBA merger, and as a result Carr joined the NBA as a member of the Detroit Pistons from 1976–79. Upon his arrival in Detroit, he famously delivered the one-liner "Hey, since I'm here, I'm going to change my name from M. L. Carr to Abdul Automobile." During the 1976-77 NBA season, Carr played all 82 games and averaged the second most points of any Piston at 13.3, behind only Bob Lanier. The 1977 NBA Playoffs marked Carr's first postseason appearance, though Detroit, then in the Western Conference, were eliminated in the first round by the Golden State Warriors. On December 27, 1978, Carr set a career high with 36 points scored in a win against the Houston Rockets.

After being selected to the All-Defense second team upon the conclusion of the 1979 season for leading the league in steals at a career best 2.5 steals per game, Carr was signed as a free agent by the rebuilding Boston Celtics.  Pistons coach Dick Vitale responded by saying, "We just had the heart and soul ripped from our team." The Carr acquisition was one of the four major additions which immediately propelled the Celtics back to the top of the NBA standings after finishing near the bottom the previous season, along with majority owner Harry Mangurian, head coach Bill Fitch and rookie forward Larry Bird.  Carr was instrumental in leading the Celtics' defense past the favored Philadelphia 76ers in the 1981 Eastern Conference Finals, on the way to Boston's 14th NBA championship.  Playing for the Celtics until 1985, Carr averaged 9.7 points and 4.3 rebounds per game during his NBA career.

Carr is well known for the steal and dunk he made in overtime of Game 4 of the 1984 NBA Finals versus the Lakers in Los Angeles, which sealed the victory for Boston, and eventually won another title for them. Carr was also famous for waving a towel during crucial situations to fire up the Celtics.

Coaching career
Carr later became the General Manager of the Celtics in 1994.  He later took over as coach for the 1995–96 and 1996–97 seasons.  In his last year as coach, the Celtics had the worst record in team history, winning just 15 games and losing 67 in a tactical effort to get a stronger draft position and poise the team for a comeback under famed college coach Rick Pitino. He was replaced at the end of season by Pitino, who was unable to restore the team to the glory of Carr's playing days. After the 1997 season, he became the Celtics' Director of Corporate Development.

Carr later became president of the WNBA's Charlotte Sting as part of a failed attempt to become the owner of an expansion NBA team in Charlotte, along with Steve Belkin and former teammate Larry Bird.  He was given a small investment stake in the Charlotte Bobcats when Bob Johnson was selected to have the NBA franchise in Charlotte.  Subsequently, Bob Johnson sold the team and  Carr no longer has a relationship with the Bobcat franchise.

Carr currently resides in Massachusetts with his wife Sylvia, where he is a partner with New Technology Ventures - a tech-focused venture capital firm based in Newton.

Coaching record

|-
| align="left" |Boston
| align="left" |
|82||33||49|||| align="center" |5th in Atlantic||—||—||—||—
| align="center" |Missed playoffs
|-
| align="left" |Boston
| align="left" |
|82||15||67|||| align="center" |7th in Atlantic||—||—||—||—
| align="center" |Missed playoffs
|-class="sortbottom"
| style="text-align:center;" colspan="2" | Career
|164||48||116|||| ||—||—||—||—||

NBA career statistics

Regular season 

|-
| style="text-align:left;"| 
| style="text-align:left;"|St. Louis (ABA)
| 74 || – || 29.4 || .483 || .375 || .665 || 6.2 || 3.0 || 1.7 || 0.6 || 12.2
|-
| style="text-align:left;"| 
| style="text-align:left;"|Detroit
| 82 || – || 32.2 || .476 || – || .735 || 7.7 || 2.2 || 2.0 || 0.7 || 13.3
|-
| style="text-align:left;"| 
| style="text-align:left;"|Detroit
| 79 || – || 32.4 || .455 || – || .738 || 7.1 || 2.3 || 1.9 || 0.3 || 12.4
|-
| style="text-align:left;"| 
| style="text-align:left;"|Detroit
| 80 || – || 40.1 || .514 || – || .743 || 7.4 || 3.3 ||style="background:#cfecec;"| 2.5* || 0.6 || 18.7
|-
| style="text-align:left;"| 
| style="text-align:left;"|Boston
| 82 || 7 || 24.3 || .474 || .293 || .739 || 4.0 || 1.9 || 1.5 || 0.4 || 11.1
|-
| style="text-align:left;background:#afe6ba;"|†
| style="text-align:left;"|Boston
| 41 || 7 || 16.0 || .449 || .071 || .791 || 2.0 || 1.4 || 0.7 || 0.4 || 6.0
|-
| style="text-align:left;"| 
| style="text-align:left;"|Boston
| 56 || 27 || 23.1 || .450 || .294 || .707 || 2.7 || 2.3 || 1.2 || 0.4 || 8.1
|-
| style="text-align:left;"| 
| style="text-align:left;"|Boston
| 77 || 0 || 11.5 || .429 || .158 || .741 || 1.8 || 0.9 || 0.6 || 0.1 || 4.3
|-
| style="text-align:left;background:#afe6ba;"| †
| style="text-align:left;"|Boston
| 60 || 1 || 9.8 || .409 || .200 || .875 || 1.3 || 0.8 || 0.3 || 0.1 || 3.1
|-
| style="text-align:left;"| 
| style="text-align:left;"|Boston
| 47 || 0 || 8.4 || .416 || .391 || 1.000 || 0.9 || 0.5 || 0.4 || 0.1 || 3.2
|- class="sortbottom"
| style="text-align:center;" colspan="2"| Career
| 678 || 42 || 24.2 || .472 || .275 || .737 || 4.5 || 2.0 || 1.4 || 0.4 || 10.0

Playoffs 

|-
|style="text-align:left;"|1977
|style="text-align:left;”|Detroit
|3||–||37.3||.387||–||.571||5.7||2.0||0.3||1.0||9.3
|-
|style="text-align:left;"|1980
|style="text-align:left;”|Boston
|9||–||19.1||.400||.400||.667||3.7||1.2||0.7||0.1||9.1
|-
| style="text-align:left;background:#afe6ba;"|1981†
|style="text-align:left;”|Boston
|17||–||16.9||.416||.000||.750||1.5||0.8||0.6||0.4||6.0
|-
|style="text-align:left;"|1982
|style="text-align:left;”|Boston
|12||–||25.4||.352||.000||.652||3.6||2.3||0.9||0.1||7.4
|-
|style="text-align:left;"|1983
|style="text-align:left;”|Boston
|3||–||7.3||.250||.000||1.000||0.3||0.0||0.7||0.0||2.0
|-
| style="text-align:left;background:#afe6ba;"|1984†
|style="text-align:left;”|Boston
|16||–||5.1||.406||.333||.909||0.5||0.3||0.4||0.0||2.4
|-
|style="text-align:left;"|1985
|style="text-align:left;”|Boston
|7||0||3.4||.267||.500||–||0.3||0.1||0.1||0.0||1.3
|- class="sortbottom"
| style="text-align:center;" colspan="2"| Career
| 67 || ? || 15.0 || .382 || .227 || .714 || 1.9 || 1.0 || 0.6 || 0.1 || 5.3

References

1951 births
Living people
20th-century African-American sportspeople
21st-century African-American people
African-American basketball coaches
African-American basketball players
American men's basketball players
Basketball coaches from North Carolina
Basketball players from North Carolina
Boston Celtics head coaches
Boston Celtics players
Charlotte Bobcats owners
Charlotte Sting executives
Detroit Pistons players
Guilford Quakers men's basketball players
Kansas City Kings draft picks
Kentucky Colonels draft picks
National Basketball Association general managers
People from Barnstable, Massachusetts
Shooting guards
Small forwards
Spirits of St. Louis players
Sportspeople from Barnstable County, Massachusetts
Women's National Basketball Association executives